Women's cricket is the form of the team sport of cricket when played by women only. It is played at the professional level in multiple countries around the world and 108 national teams participate internationally. 11 of them have WTest and WODI status and others have WT20I status.
The first recorded match was in England on 26 July 1745.

In November 2021, the International Cricket Council (ICC) retrospectively applied first-class and List A status to women's cricket, aligning it with the men's game.

History

The first recorded match of women's cricket was reported in The Reading Mercury on 26 July 1745, a match contested "between eleven maids of Bramley and eleven maids of Hambledon, all dressed in white."  The first known women's cricket club was formed in 1887 in Yorkshire, named the White Heather Club.  Three years later a team known as the Original English Lady Cricketers toured England, reportedly making substantial profits before their manager absconded with the money. In Australia, a women's cricket league was set up in 1894, while in South Africa, Port Elizabeth had a women's cricket team, the Pioneers Cricket Club.
In Canada, Victoria also had a women's cricket team that played at Beacon Hill Park.

In 1958 the International Women's Cricket Council (IWCC) was formed to co-ordinate women's cricket around the world, taking over from the English Women's Cricket Association, which had been doing the same job in a de facto role since its creation 32 years earlier.  In 2005, the IWCC was merged with the International Cricket Council (ICC) to form one unified body to help manage and develop cricket.

Women's international cricket

Women's cricket has been played internationally since the inaugural women's Test match between England women and Australia women in December 1934.  The following year, New Zealand women joined them. in 2007 Netherlands women became the tenth women's Test nation when they made their debut against South Africa women. A total of 141 Women's Test matches have been played.

Women's One Day Internationals (ODIs) were introduced in 1973 at the inaugural Women's Cricket World Cup. The 1,000th women's ODI took place in 2016. Australia has dominated the format, having claimed the World Cup six times and won 80% of their matches.

In 2004, a shorter format still was initiated, with the introduction of women's Twenty20 International, referring to a match restricted to twenty overs per side.  Initially, women's Twenty20 cricket was played little at international level, with only four matches played by the end of 2006.  However, the following three years saw a rapid growth, with six matches been played in 2007, ten in 2008 and thirty in 2009, which also saw the first ICC Women's World Twenty20. In April 2018, the ICC granted full women's Twenty20 International status to all its members.

Australia are the only women team to achieve three global titles in last 12 months.

Women's franchise cricket
Since 2015, women have played franchise cricket in the Australian Women's Big Bash League.

In 2016, the semi-professional Women's Cricket Super League formed in England and Wales.

2018 marked the inaugural year for women's franchise cricket in India. Women's T20 Challenge was a two team Twenty20 cricket competition in 2018. A year later in 2019, the competition was expanded as a three team tournament.

In 2018, the England and Wales Cricket Board announced plans for The Hundred tournament, set to launch in July 2021. During this period, the men's and women's teams have been marketed against each other and, on 23 January 2021, it was announced that the tournament would start with a women's match.

In 2022, Cricket West Indies and the Caribbean Premier League announced that they would jointly organizing a quarterly T10 cricket competition called The 6ixty, starting with a five-day tournament in August 2022. The women's edition of the tournament will feature the three teams from the also-inaugural edition of the Women's Caribbean Premier League. The 6ixty was partly inspired by the women's exhibition T10 matches that were played just before the 2019 Caribbean Premier League playoff matches.

Commonwealth Games 2022
In August 2019, Commonwealth Games Foundation announced addition of women's cricket to 2022 Commonwealth Games. The matches held in Edgbaston featuring a total of eight teams competing in a T20 format during July and August 2022. It was cricket's first inclusion in the Commonwealth Games since a List A men's tournament was held at the 1998 Commonwealth Games in Kuala Lumpur, Malaysia. The matches were played as Women's Twenty20 Internationals (WT20Is), with only a women's tournament being part of the Games.

Australia became the first team to qualify for the semi-finals, after winning their first two matches in Group A. New Zealand's win over Sri Lanka in the second round of matches ensured their own and England's progression to the semi-finals. India completed the semi-final line-up, beating Barbados in their final group match. India won the first semi-final, beating England by 4 runs. Australia won the second semi-final, beating New Zealand by 5 wickets.

New Zealand claimed the bronze medal after beating England by 8 wickets in the Bronze Medal Match. Australia claimed the gold medal, with India taking silver, after winning the Gold Medal Match by 9 runs. Australian batter Beth Mooney was the leading run-scorer in the tournament, with 179 runs, whilst India's Renuka Singh was the leading wicket-taker, with 11 wickets.

See also

Lists of women Test cricketers
Lists of women One Day International cricketers
Lists of women Twenty20 International cricketers
ICC Women's Player Rankings

References

External links
Cricinfo Women

 
Cricket